Play School  was a British children's television series produced by the BBC which ran from 21 April 1964 until 11 March 1988. It was created by Joy Whitby and was aimed at preschool children. Each programme followed a broad theme and consisted of songs, stories and activities with presenters in the studio, along with a short film introduced through either the square, round or arched window in the set.

The programme spawned numerous spin-offs in Britain and other countries and involved many presenters and musicians during its run. Despite a revamp in 1983, Play School maintained the same basic formula throughout its 24-year history, but changes to the BBC's children's output led to the programme's cancellation in 1988, when it was replaced by Playbus, which soon became Playdays.

Broadcast history 
Play School originally appeared on weekdays at 11am on BBC2 and received holiday runs on BBC1 in Summer 1964 and 1965, later acquiring a mid-afternoon BBC1 repeat as the opening programme of BBC1's teatime children's schedule. The morning showing was transferred to BBC1 in September 1983 when BBC Schools programming transferred to BBC2. It remained in that slot even after daytime television was launched in October 1986 and continued to be broadcast at that time until it was superseded in October 1988 by Playbus.

When the BBC scrapped the afternoon edition of Play School in April 1985, to make way for a variety of children's programmes in the afternoon, a Sunday morning compilation was launched called Hello Again!.

There were several opening sequences for Play School during its run, the first being "Here's a house, here's a door. Windows: 1 2 3 4. Ready to knock? Turn the lock – It's Play School." This changed in the early 1970s to "A house – with a door. 1, 2, 3, 4. Ready to play? What's the day?  It's..." In this version blinds opened on the windows as the numbers were spoken.

The blinds were no longer featured towards the end of the 1970s and the word "windows" was added before "1 2 3 4". The final opening sequence involved a multicoloured house with no apparent windows. This was used from 1983 until the end of the programme. This saw the most radical revamp of the programme overall (not just in the opening titles). The opening legend then became "Get ready. To play. What's the day?  It's..."

Unlike earlier BBC programmes aimed at preschool children such as Watch with Mother, Play School featured real presenters who spoke directly to their audience. Presenters included the first black host of a children's show, Paul Danquah; Brian Cant, who remained with the show for 21 years; actress Julie Stevens; Canadian actor and television presenter Rick Jones; TV personality Johnny Ball; former pop singers Lionel Morton and Toni Arthur; husband and wife Eric Thompson and Phyllida Law; Italian model and actor Marla Landi; and Balamory producer Brian Jameson. Don Spencer and Diane Dorgan also appeared on the Australian version. Play School and another BBC children's television programme Jackanory were sometimes recorded at BBC Birmingham or BBC Manchester when BBC Television Centre in London was busy.

Contents of the show

A section of each episode was a filmed excursion into the outside world taken through one of three windows: the young viewers were invited to guess whether the round, square, or arched window would be chosen that day, usually by means of the phrase, "...Have a look – through the....(whichever) window." A triangular window was added in 1983. Very often the film would be of a factory producing something such as chocolate biscuits, or of a domestic industry such as refuse collection, but a number of subject matters were covered, such as watching animals or fish, boats on a lake, children in a playground or at school, a family going tenpin bowling, people in a cafe and visiting a jumble sale, among other things.

At the beginning of the 1983 revamp, the windows were now referred to as "shapes" as in "'let's have a look through one of the shapes..." After the shapes were moved to a spinning disc, the programme went back to using windows which resembled those used in the late 70s, albeit with the addition of the triangular window. Whenever they were shown now, only the window that the show was using for the day would be on the set.

Each episode would also include a short story read from a book, introduced by checking the time on a clock. Normally the clock would show either an hour or a half hour and the young viewers were asked, "Can you tell what time the clock says today? Well, the long hand is pointing straight up, so that means it's something o'clock – and the short hand is pointing to the number...two (or whatever). So today, the clock says, two...o'...clock" (the latter phrase always delivered very slowly). This was followed by, "But what's underneath the clock?", and viewers would then see a turntable under the clock featuring certain items such as toy animals or clocks, which were, in a clever twist, always a clue to the forthcoming story. This was all accompanied by a slightly eerie, yet undeniably catchy, clock-like tune. (On one occasion, the item under the clock turned out to be none other than Little Ted, so the presenter concerned said, "What a very odd place for a toy to be!" and the story appropriately turned out to be about odd things.)

Both the clock and the three window option live on in the children's programme Tikkabilla, which borrows much from Play School, while a similar choice of portal into a film clip was provided by the abdomen-mounted video displays in the children's show Teletubbies.

Most of the programmes were studio-based, but there were a number of outside broadcasts at a variety of locations, such as zoos, seasides, central London, churches, schools and farms.

There would also be songs, games, poems and stories, as well as regular painting and craft activities. The presenters would frequently invite the younger viewers to participate at home, usually by means of the prompt, 'Can you do that?' They normally signed off at the end of each episode by saying, "Time for us to go now, but only until tomorrow, so goodbye until tomorrow" – or, at the end of a week, "Goodbye, until it's our turn to be here again". (The latter phrase stemmed from the fact that the presenters changed from one week to the next.)

From 1971 to 1984, Play School also had a sister programme called Play Away.

Many 2 inch Quadruplex videotape master copies of Play School editions were wiped by the BBC in 1993 on the assumption that they were of no further use and that examples of some other episodes were sufficient.

Overseas sales and adoption

Play School was sold to Australia, and was then followed by local production. The Australian version has been produced since 1966. Similarly New Zealand bought the programme before producing their own from 1972 to 1982 & 1986 to 1989. The Canadian adaptation was Polka Dot Door and ran from 1971 to 1993.

Other countries including Lekestue in Norway (1971–81), Das Spielhaus in Switzerland (1968-1994), Das Kleine Haus in Austria (1969-1975), Giocagiò in Italy (1966-1970), La Casa Del Reloj in Spain (1971–74), and Israel were provided with scripts and film segments so they could produce their own versions.

Presenters
The first show was presented by Virginia Stride and Gordon Rollings. Other presenters throughout the 24-year run included 

 Rick Jones
 Carole Ward
 Brian Cant
 Eric Thompson and his wife Phyllida Law
 Julie Stevens
 Terence Frisby (as Terence Holland)
 Marla Landi
 Paul Danquah
 Gordon Clyde
 Valerie Pitts
 Colin Jeavons
 Carol Chell
 Miranda Connell
 Wally Whyton
 Ann Morrish
 John White
 Johnny Ball
 Lionel Morton
 Chloe Ashcroft and her husband David Hargreaves
 Diane Dorgan
 Johnny Silvo
 Derek Griffiths
 Beryl Roques
 Sarah Long
 Toni Arthur
 Carmen Munroe
 Don Spencer
 Jon Glover
 Fred Harris
 John Golder
 Karen Platt
 Carol Leader
 Stuart McGugan
 Chris Tranchell
 Floella Benjamin
 Ben Bazell
 Sheelagh Gilbey
 Elizabeth Millbank
 Ben Thomas
 Christopher Bramwell
 Lucie Skeaping
 Iain Lauchlan
 Patrick Abernethy
 Elizabeth Watts (presenter)
 Brian Jameson
 Wayne Jackman
 Jane Hardy
 Stuart Bradley
 Kate Copstick
 Delia Morgan
 Mike Amatt

Only four of these presenters presented the programme during all three decades of its existence, namely Brian Cant (1964–85), Carol Chell (1966–88), Johnny Ball (1967–84 & 1986–87) and Chloe Ashcroft (1969–88). Chell was both the longest-serving presenter and the one who made the most appearances on the programme (763 in total). In addition, two regular presenters from the 1960s and 1970s, namely Lionel Morton and Colin Jeavons, made a few guest appearances on the programme during the 1980s. Other presenters who were on the programme for 10 or more years included Julie Stevens, Derek Griffiths, Fred Harris, Don Spencer, Sarah Long, Floella Benjamin, Stuart McGugan and Carol Leader.

In many cases five programmes would be produced in the space of two days, with one day of rehearsal and one day of recording.

Celebrity storytellers
A number of famous people also appeared on the show as storytellers: many became semi-regulars. They included: Val Doonican, Richard Baker, Rolf Harris, Clive Dunn, Roy Castle, Pat Coombs, David Kossoff, Patricia Hayes, Sam Kydd, James Blades, Frank Windsor, Roy Kinnear, George Chisholm, Ted Moult and Cilla Black. Both existing and former Play School presenters also frequently made guest appearances as storytellers.

Musicians
Many musicians worked on the programme over the years: they included Jonathan Cohen, William Blezard, Peter Gosling, Alan Grahame, Paul Reade, Spike Heatley, Alan Rushton, Pedro Goble, Anne Dudley, John Gould, Martin Yates and Peter Pettinger. Some of them, in particular Cohen, Gosling, Grahame and Reade, occasionally appeared on camera, especially during Christmas editions.

Toys
The presenters were accompanied by a supporting cast of cuddly toys and dolls. The five regulars were:
 Humpty, a dark green large egg-shaped soft toy with green trousers, to look like Humpty Dumpty from the nursery rhyme, as he was the first Play School toy introduced, since the first programme on 21 April 1964. Several versions were made.
 Teddy/Big Ted and Little Ted, twin teddy bears. Little Ted debuted in 1968. Before this, Big Ted was called "Teddy."
 Jemima, a rag doll with long red (or pink) and white striped legs.
 Hamble was a little doll and one of the original five toys but dropped from the show during the 1980s to be replaced by Poppy. According to Joy Whitby, creator of Play School, Hamble was chosen as representative of a more "downtrodden", humble background than the "middle-class" associations that the teddy bears had. She was disliked by presenters as she could not be cuddled. According to the BBC website Chloe Ashcroft "did a terrible thing to Hamble. She just would not sit up...so one day I got a very big knitting needle, a big wooden one, and I stuck it right up her bum, as far as her head. So she was completely rigid, and she was much much better after that." 
 Poppy, a black doll, replaced Hamble in November 1986 in response to changing attitudes in society (the Hamble doll was also getting rather fragile at this point).

A rocking horse named Dapple was first seen in May 1965 and made occasional appearances, when a particular song or item suggested it.  The final line up of toys are on display as exhibits of the National Science and Media Museum, Bradford. The original Humpty was developed by soft toy makers "Ostrobogulous Toys" run by Kristin Baybars, daughter of Blair Hughes-Stanton and Ida Affleck Graves and Minnie King. Jemima was made by Annette Shelley.

Pets

 Katoo, Charlie and Sparky –  cockatoo
 Bit and Bot – goldfish
 Rabbits, including Buffy, Mopsy, Peter, Benjamin and Becky.
 Mice
 Guinea pigs including Lizzy

The pets were cared for by Wendy Duggan, Fellow of the Zoological Society.

See also

 Play Away
 Playdays
 Tikkabilla
 Show Me Show Me
 Play School (Australian TV series)
 Play School (New Zealand TV series)
 Polka Dot Door
 ZOOM (1972 TV series)
 Mister Rogers' Neighborhood
 Captain Kangaroo
 Sesame Street

Notes

References
25 Minutes Peace – Celebrating Play School (BBC TV programme, 1979)
Paul R Jackson, Here's A House – A Celebration of Play School Kaleidoscope
Volume 1 (2010) 
Volume 2 (2011)

External links 

1964 British television series debuts
1988 British television series endings
1960s British children's television series
1970s British children's television series
1980s British children's television series
British television shows featuring puppetry
BBC children's television shows
Lost BBC episodes
British preschool education television series
1960s preschool education television series
1970s preschool education television series
1980s preschool education television series
English-language television shows
Television series about bears
Television series about horses
Television series by BBC Studios